In Tibetan cuisine, xabbatog is a dough stuffed with shredded turnips and dry curd cheese and cooked with bone soup.

See also
 List of stuffed dishes
 List of Tibetan dishes

References

Tibetan cuisine
Stuffed dishes